Oslomej is a former municipality in western Republic of North Macedonia, created in 1996 territorial organisation and dissolved following the 2013 Macedonian new territorial organisation, after it was merged with Kičevo Municipality.
Oslomej is also the name of the village where the municipal seat was found.
Oslomej Municipality was part of the Southwestern Statistical Region.

Geography
The municipality bordered
 Makedonski Brod Municipality to the east,
 Vraneštica Municipality to the south,
 Kičevo Municipality to the southwest,
 Zajas Municipality to the west, and
 Gostivar Municipality to the north.

Demographics

According to the last national census from 2002, this municipality has 10,420 inhabitants.
Ethnic groups in the municipality include:
Albanians = 10,252 (98.4%)
Macedonians = 110 (1.1%)
others = 58 (0.6%)

The total number of students in the municipality in 2011, in comparison to the total number of students in 2007, declined for 36.8%. Oslomej is the first municipality in North Macedonia by the decline of the total number of students.

References

External links

 Official website

Former municipalities of North Macedonia
Kičevo Municipality